The Sofa of Time is a BBC Radio 4 fantasy comedy drama written by and starring Nick Frost and Matt King. It was first broadcast in 2002.

Concept
Milford (King) and Parker (Frost) get sacked from their jobs in a soft furnishings factory in Crouch End. As they are clearing out their lockers, they fall into the magical world of Gravy.  Frost described Gravy as a "Tolkien-esque world with supermarkets and banks".

There they meet Marmite the Dwarf (Mark Heap), who believes that Milford is "the chosen one" and has come at last to save the people from the evil emperor warlock Raamen Bod (Peter Serafinowicz), who plans to find the Sofa of Time, the most magical and powerful item of furniture in the entire universe, and use it for evil purposes.

History
The series features Spaced regulars Mark Heap, Julia Deakin, Peter Serafinowicz, and Simon Pegg as well as Kevin Eldon, Daisy Jones and Joseph Marcell.  The series was produced by Mario Stylianides, for Talkback.

The BBC offered King and Frost a second series, but they declined as King had moved back to Australia. The series has never been made commercially available, but over the years it has been repeated several times on BBC Radio 4 Extra (and that channel's earlier incarnation, BBC Radio 7).

Episode list

Some sources (e.g. epguides.com) also list the alternative title "A Lovely Day in Tangleton" for episode two.
The web page maintained by BBC Radio 4 Extra lists the first episode as "There's Gravy in My Locker". This was clearly an afterthought, and can be regarded as an administrative error, since the unchanged announcement within the episode still entitles it "There's a World in My Locker".

Soundtrack

The soundtrack borrowed heavily from Maurice Jarre's score for Franco Zeffirelli's Jesus of Nazareth

References

External links
BBC page for the series
epguides.com

BBC Radio comedy programmes